Middletown may refer to:

Places

Ireland
Middletown, a townland south of Courtown in County Wexford

United Kingdom
Middletown, County Armagh, Northern Ireland
Middletown, Cumbria, a village in Lowside Quarter parish, Cumbria, England
Middlestown, Wakefield, West Yorkshire, England
Middletown, Powys, a small village in Trewern, Powys, Wales
Middletown, Somerset, a location in England
Middletown, Warwickshire, a location in England

United States
Middletown, California, a census-designated place in Lake County
Middletown, San Diego, California neighborhood
Middletown, Connecticut
Middletown, Delaware
Middletown, Illinois
Middletown, Indiana
Middletown, Allen County, Indiana
Middletown, Shelby County, Indiana
Prairie Creek, Indiana, also known as Middletown
Middletown, Iowa
Middletown, Kentucky
Middletown, Maryland
Middletown, Michigan
Middletown, Missouri
Middletown Township, New Jersey, referred to as "Middletown"
Middletown, New York (disambiguation), several places
Middletown, Ohio, in Butler County
Middletown, Champaign County, Ohio
Middletown, Crawford County, Ohio
Middletown, Dauphin County, Pennsylvania
Middletown, Northampton County, Pennsylvania
Middletown, Rhode Island
Middletown, Virginia
Middletown Township (disambiguation), several locations

Film and Television
Middletown, 1982 television documentary series created and produced by Peter Davis
Middletown (1996 film), 1996 American film by Philip Botti featuring the Evil Clown of Middletown
Middletown (2006 film), 2006 Irish film by Brian Kirk, see 4th Irish Film & Television Awards

Other
Middletown station (disambiguation), stations of the name
"Middletown Dreams", song by Rush
Middletown, play by Will Eno

See also
Middletown studies, the 1929 and 1937 sociological case study of Muncie, Indiana, given the pseudonym of "Middletown America"
Middleton (disambiguation)
Middle Town (disambiguation)